Sakaria Taulafo (born 29 January 1983) is a Samoa international rugby union player and a New Zealand national. He currently plays for Rugby United New York (RUNY) of Major League Rugby (MLR).

Career
Taulafo attended Nelson College in 2002 and was a member of the school's 1st XV rugby union team. He can play at loosehead or tighthead prop. He initially played for Tasman and Nelson Bays in the Air New Zealand Cup.

He made his debut for Samoa on their 2009 Autumn tour and represented them until 2016. 

From 2009 — 2013 he played for the London Wasps in the English club competition, the Aviva Premiership. From 2013 — 2018 he played for Stade Francais.

In 2020 he moved to the United States to play for the Glendale Raptors of Major League Rugby (MLR), before being traded to Rugby United New York for the 2021 season.

References

External links
Tasman Profile
London Wasps Profile

Living people
1983 births
People educated at Nelson College
Wasps RFC players
Tasman rugby union players
Stade Français players
New Zealand rugby union players
Samoa international rugby union players
New Zealand expatriate rugby union players
Expatriate rugby union players in England
New Zealand expatriate sportspeople in England
New Zealand expatriate sportspeople in France
Expatriate rugby union players in France
Nelson Bays rugby union players
Rugby union props
American Raptors players
Rugby New York players